Dr. David Silbersweig is chairman of psychiatry at Brigham and Women's Hospital in Boston, where he also co-directs the center for the neurosciences.  He was an academic dean at Harvard Medical School, and is Stanley Cobb Professor of Psychiatry there.

Until 2008, Silbersweig was vice chair for research within the department of psychiatry at Weill Cornell Medical College, where he was director of neuropsychiatry and co-director of the functional neuroimaging laboratory.  He is a psychiatrist and neurologist whose scientific  work concerns the physiological side of mental illness; in particular, he has done extensive work imaging the brains of patients with schizophrenia and other major psychiatric disorders, identifying underlying brain circuit abnormalities.

Silbersweig has presented medical scientific information to the general public.  He gave a presentation on post traumatic stress disorder on NBC television shortly after the September 11th attacks, and has also reported on clinical depression for CBS.  He has extensive involvement in higher education, and has published pieces on education and healthcare in the Washington Post and Boston Globe.  Silbersweig is a graduate of Dartmouth College and Cornell University Medical College.

External links
 Information about a documentary in which Silbersweig participated
  education article
  academic medical center article
  higher education article

American psychiatrists
Dartmouth College alumni
Living people
Weill Cornell Medical College alumni
Year of birth missing (living people)